Race Street Historic District is a registered historic district in Cincinnati, Ohio, listed in the National Register of Historic Places on August 4, 1995.  It contains 24 contributing buildings.

A notable building in this historic district is the former John Shillito Company department store. It has been converted into luxury apartments and businesses. A significant feature of the building is the restoration of the skylit atrium that was part of the original building designed by Samuel Hannaford.

Historic uses 
Business
Professional
Specialty Store
Department Store
Sport Facility

Notes 

Historic districts in Cincinnati
National Register of Historic Places in Cincinnati
Historic districts on the National Register of Historic Places in Ohio